Gayasan National Park, also known as Gaya Mountain National Park, is a large national park in the eastern part of South Korea. The park is named in honor of Gaya Mountain and became a National Park in 1972.

The park includes Haeinsa, which is one of the main temples of the Jogye Order of Korean Buddhism.

Geography
Gayasan National Park covers an area of more than 160 square kilometers. The national park extends from the northern edge of South Gyeongsang Province, to the southern limit of North Gyeongsang Province. The Sobaek Mountain range runs through this area.

Gaya Mountain

The national park is named in honor of Gaya Mountain. This mountain has two major peaks: one of them is Sangwangbong Peak, for which the height is 1,430 meters, and the other slightly higher peak, Chulbulbong, is 1,433 above sea level.

Special features

One significant feature of the national park is Haeinsa. This Buddhist temple includes in its grounds a standing Buddha figure carved into a vertical rock.

Another feature of the park is Yongmun Falls and Hongnyudong Valley. 380 different species of plant have been identified as growing there, as well as 100 species of birds, and other wild animals.

History
The area was declared scenic site number 5 by the Korean government in 1966, and it became an official National Park in 1972.

The remoteness of the area has played a role in protecting it from destruction in the past, specifically during the Japanese invasions of 1592-98, when much of the country was razed.

Since that time, legend says that the area around Gaya Mountains is free from the Three Disasters: fire, floods and wind.

Gallery

Recreation
Gayasan National Park has multiple hiking trails that run through the mountainous park. The most trafficked trail begins in Heinsa Temple and contains a guard station that provides park information for visitors. 

There are three designated campgrounds within the borders of the park for day use and overnight tent camping.

References

External links
The park's page on Korea National Park Service's website

Korea in the Clouds: A Detailed Guide to Hiking Korea's Mountains
Printable Trailmap of Gayasan (from Korea in the Clouds)

Parks in South Gyeongsang Province
Parks in North Gyeongsang Province
National parks of South Korea
Mountains of South Korea
Protected areas established in 1972
Mountains of North Gyeongsang Province
Mountains of South Gyeongsang Province